Olifants River may refer to any of the following rivers in Southern Africa:

Olifants River (Western Cape), draining in the Atlantic Ocean. Located in the southwestern area of the Western Cape Province
Olifants River (Southern Cape), part of the Gourits River System flowing through the Klein Karoo. Located in the southern area of the Western Cape Province
Olifants River (Limpopo), a tributary of the Limpopo River flowing through Mpumalanga and Limpopo provinces (South Africa) and Gaza Province (Mozambique) 
Olifants River, Namibia, a tributary of the Auob River